SS Murray M. Blum was a Liberty ship built in the United States during World War II. She was named after Murray M. Blum, the radio operator of  who drowned, 3 December 1943, attempting to save an overboard crewman.

Construction
Murray M. Blum was laid down on 19 September 1944, under a Maritime Commission (MARCOM) contract, MC hull 2381, by J.A. Jones Construction, Brunswick, Georgia; she was sponsored by Mrs. Sylvia Blum, the mother of the ships namesake, and launched on 25 October 1944.

History
She was allocated to Mississippi Shipping Co., Inc., on 7 November 1944. On 17 December 1947, she was laid up in the National Defense Reserve Fleet, in Beaumont, Texas. On 30 April 1952, she was laid up in the National Defense Reserve Fleet, in Mobile, Alabama. On 12 March 1971, she was sold for $44,100, to Pinto Island Metals Company, for scrapping. She was removed from the fleet on 8 April 1971.

References

Bibliography

 
 
 
 
 

 

Liberty ships
Ships built in Brunswick, Georgia
1944 ships
Beaumont Reserve Fleet
Mobile Reserve Fleet